The Hollywood Sign is an American landmark and cultural icon overlooking Hollywood, Los Angeles, California. Originally the Hollywoodland Sign, it is situated on Mount Lee, in the Beachwood Canyon area of the Santa Monica Mountains. Spelling out the word Hollywood in  white uppercase letters and 350 feet (106.7 m) long, it was originally created in 1923 as a temporary advertisement for a local real estate development, but due to increasing recognition the sign was left up, and replaced in 1978 with a more durable all-steel structure.

Among the best-known landmarks in both California and the United States, the sign makes frequent appearances in popular culture, particularly in establishing shots for films and television programs set in or around Hollywood. Signs of similar style, but spelling different words, are frequently seen as parodies. The Hollywood Chamber of Commerce holds trademark rights to the Hollywood Sign but only for certain uses.

Because of its widespread recognizability and its visibility from many points across the Los Angeles Basin, the sign has been a frequent target of pranks and vandalism across the decades. It has since undergone restoration, including the installation of a security system to deter mischief. The sign is protected and promoted by the nonprofit "The Hollywood Sign Trust", while its site and the surrounding land are part of Griffith Park.

Visitors can hike to the sign from the Bronson Canyon entrance to Griffith Park or from Griffith Observatory. There is also a trailhead near the Lake Hollywood Reservoir outside of Griffith Park, and although not an access point in itself, there is a popular scenic vista point around Lake Hollywood Park near the trailhead.

History

Origin 
The original sign was erected in 1923 and originally read "HOLLYWOODLAND" to promote the name of a new housing development in the hills above the Hollywood district of Los Angeles.

Real estate developers Woodruff and Shoults called their development "Hollywoodland" and advertised it as a "superb environment without excessive cost on the Hollywood side of the hills."

The sign was originally illuminated and stayed so for about a decade, until new owners decided keeping it lit was too expensive.

They contracted the Crescent Sign Company to erect thirteen south-facing letters on the hillside. Studded with around 4,000 light bulbs, the completed sign alternated between flashing in successive segments "HOLLY," "WOOD," and "LAND" and as a whole. Below the sign was a searchlight to attract more attention. The poles that supported the sign were hauled to the site by mules. The project cost $21,000, .

The sign was officially dedicated in 1923, intended to last only a year and a half. The rise of American cinema in Los Angeles during the Golden Age of Hollywood gave it widespread visibility, causing it to be left beyond that, for over a quarter century still spelling "Hollywoodland".

Deterioration and restoration

1940s 
In time, the sign deteriorated. The letter H was destroyed in early 1944. A United Press report in 1949 indicated that winds were to blame, while the Los Angeles Times said that the H was destroyed by "vandals or windstorms."

In 1949, the sign drew complaints from local residents, who called it an "eyesore and detriment to the community" and advocated its demolition. The Hollywood Chamber of Commerce protested against the sign's removal and offered to repair it. The Chamber entered into a contract with the City of Los Angeles Parks Department to repair and rebuild the sign. The contract stipulated that "LAND" be removed to spell "Hollywood" and reflect the district, not the "Hollywoodland" housing development. The restoration and removal of the "land" portion of the sign was conducted in September 1949.

1970s 

The sign's unprotected wood-and-sheet-metal structure deteriorated over the years. After a storm on 10 February 1978, the first O was splintered and broken, resembling a lowercase u, and the third O had fallen down completely, leaving the severely dilapidated sign reading "HuLLYWO D."

In 1978, in large part because of the public campaign to restore the landmark by Hugh Hefner, founder of Playboy magazine, the Chamber set out to replace the severely deteriorated sign with a more permanent structure. Nine donors gave US$27,778 each (totaling US$250,000) to sponsor replacement letters, made of steel supported by steel columns on a concrete foundation (see Donors section below).

The new version of the sign was unveiled on November 11, 1978, as the culmination of a live CBS television special commemorating the 75th anniversary of Hollywood's incorporation as a city.

Refurbishment, donated by Bay Cal Commercial Painting, began in November 2005 as workers stripped the letters back to their metal base and repainted them white.

Donors 

Following the 1978 public campaign to restore the sign, the following nine donors gave $27,778 each (which totaled $250,002):
 H: Terrence Donnelly (publisher of the Hollywood Independent Newspaper)
 O: Alice Cooper (singer), who donated in memory of comedian Groucho Marx
 L: Les Kelley (founder of Kelley Blue Book)
 L: Gene Autry (actor)
 Y: Hugh Hefner (founder of Playboy)
 W: Andy Williams (singer)
 O: Giovanni Mazza (Italian movie producer, co-founder of Panaria Film)
 O: Warner Bros. Records
 D: Dennis Lidtke (businessman, graphics company Gribbitt), donated in the name of Matthew Williams

The original sign and restoration of the "H" 

The original 1923 sign was presumed to have been destroyed until 2005, when it was put up for sale on eBay by producer/entrepreneur Dan Bliss. It was sold to artist Bill Mack, who used the sheet metal as a medium to paint the likenesses of stars from the Golden Age of Hollywood. In August 2012, Mack constructed an exact replica of the letter H from the metal. On August 9, 2012, Herb Wesson and Tom LaBonge of the Los Angeles City Council presented Mack with a Certificate of Recognition for his restoration efforts and preservation of the sign.

Access issues
Considerable public concern has arisen over certain access points to the trails leading to the sign that are in residential areas. Some residents of the neighborhoods adjoining the sign, such as Beachwood Canyon and Lake Hollywood Estates, have expressed concerns about the congestion and traffic caused by tourists and sightseers attracted to the sign. The Los Angeles Times reported in 2013 that "there are more than 40 tour companies running buses and vans in and out of the canyon..." and residents "...are most concerned about safety issues because the curving hillside roads were not designed for so many cars and pedestrians." The Los Angeles Fire Department identifies Griffith Park, where the sign resides, as a high fire risk area due to the brush and dry climate. Local residents have created fake 'no access' and other misleading signs to discourage people from visiting the sign.

In 2012, at the behest of residents of the Hollywood Hills, Los Angeles City Councilman Tom LaBonge petitioned GPS manufacturers Garmin and Google Maps to redirect traffic away from residential streets, which lack the infrastructure (e.g. parking, restrooms, potable water) to deal with the large influx of tourists, towards two designated viewing areas, Griffith Observatory and the Hollywood and Highland Center. The Hollywood Sign Trust, the nonprofit that maintains the sign, also endorses these two viewing platforms. Other mapping services, such as Apple Maps and Bing Maps, have subsequently followed suit. This was considered deceptive by some as the hike from Griffith Observatory could take up to two hours one way, and both locations are considerably farther away from other viewing locations or trails.

In 2015, the city made the northern parts of Beachwood Canyon into preferential parking districts, restricting parking on most of the streets in the neighborhood only to its homeowners.

In 2017, Beachwood Drive gate, an access point to the popular Hollyridge Trail, was closed to the public by city officials, though it remains accessible as an exit. The closure came as a response to a lawsuit by Sunset Ranch Hollywood Stables against the city for advertising a gate at the bottom of the trail, which directed tourists towards the Ranch's "exclusive easement (right of way) road". The Los Angeles County Superior Court ruled that although the path was open to the public, the proliferation of its access by the city had interfered with the Ranch's business, thus the city was ordered either to provide access near the start of the easement or reopen a previously closed trail. A spokesperson from the office of Councilman David Ryu, who succeeded Tom Labonge, stated that it was uncertain that the city could have kept the gate open while still complying with court orders.

The Friends of Griffith Park, Los Feliz Oaks Homeowners Association, and the Griffith J. Griffith Charitable Trust filed a suit together to reverse the closing of the Beachwood Gate following its closure in 2017. The court ruled in favor of Los Angeles and denied their 2018 appeal.

An aerial tramway to the top of Mount Lee and the sign has been proposed numerous times. In June 2018, Warner Bros. proposed to fund an estimated $100 million tramway that would run from its Burbank studio lot and up the north face of Mount Lee to a new visitors' area near the sign. Other proposals stakeholders have set forth include establishing an official visitors' center for the sign, public shuttle service to lead tourists to the sign or trails, or even erecting a duplicate sign on the opposite side of Mount Lee.

Suicide of Peg Entwistle 
In September 1932, 24-year-old actress Peg Entwistle died by suicide by climbing a workman's ladder up to the top of the 'H' and jumping to her death.

Location 

The sign is on the southern side of Mount Lee in Griffith Park, north of the Mulholland Highway, and to the south of the Forest Lawn Memorial Park (Hollywood Hills) cemetery.

The sign is on rough, steep terrain, and there are barriers to prevent unauthorized access. In 2000, the Los Angeles Police Department installed a security system featuring motion detection and closed-circuit cameras. Any movement in the marked restricted areas triggers an alarm that notifies the police.

The building and tower just behind and to the right of the sign is the City of Los Angeles Central Communications Facility, which supports all cellphone, microwave, and radio towers used by the Los Angeles Police Department, the Fire Department, the Los Angeles Unified School District, and other municipal agencies. The building has no name and is a large maintenance building for the antennae. From 1939 to 1947, this site was the location of the studios and transmitter of the first television station in Los Angeles, W6XAO (now KCBS-TV), founded by The Don Lee Network, hence the name Mount Lee. The TV studio left this location in 1948, and the transmission facility left in 1951, moving to the higher Mount Wilson.

Land in the vicinity of the sign was purchased by Howard Hughes in 1940, who planned to build a hilltop mansion at Cahuenga Peak for actress Ginger Rogers. Before long, Rogers broke off their engagement and the lot remained empty. Hughes' estate sold the property that lies to the left and above the sign for $1.7 million in 2002 to Fox River Financial Resources, a Chicago developer that planned to build luxury mansions along the ridgeline. It put the property on the market in 2008 for $22 million. As a result, the City of Los Angeles considered buying it, possibly by raising money from celebrities as was done for the 1978 restoration.

Environmentalists and preservationists were concerned about the possibility of real estate development in the area. In April 2009 The Trust for Public Land (TPL) signed an option to buy the  property for a discounted price of $12.5 million. On February 11, 2010, as part of a campaign to help raise money and with the full support of both the city and the Hollywood Sign Trust, the organization covered each letter of the sign with large banners reading "SAVE THE PEAK". On April 26, 2010, the Trust for Public Land announced it had raised enough money, with Playboy magazine founder Hugh Hefner stepping forward to donate the final $900,000. Hefner later gave an additional $100,000 donation. After the purchase, the parcel became an extension of nearby Griffith Park.

Alterations 

The sign was illuminated as part of the 1984 Summer Olympics held in Los Angeles.

In 1987, promotion for the prime time launch of Fox Television had the sign read "FOX" for five days.

A -tall cutout of Holli Would, main character from the film Cool World (1992), which appeared to sit on the sign, was added as part of a promotion for the film. The alteration angered local residents, who said the cartoon character was "appalling" and an insult to women.

As part of the Los Angeles County millennium celebrations, the Hollywood sign was illuminated and hosted a laser show for a television broadcast for the arrival of the year 2000. The event was produced by Carl Bendix. The sign was illuminated in various colors, one of the rare times the sign became lit; an alternative to the firework displays at several of the other world icons due to concerns about fire in the dry conditions.

Between February 14 and 16, 2022, the sign read "RAMS HOUSE" to celebrate the Los Angeles Rams' Super Bowl LVI victory. The changes were made by the Rams in collaboration with the City of Los Angeles, the Hollywood Chamber of Commerce and the Hollywood Sign Trust. Inclement weather delayed its completion, leading to the sign reading "RALLYOUSE" for much of Tuesday, and was only completed just before the Rams' victory parade the following day. The sign was criticized for being unreadable, eliciting negative reactions on Twitter, but was nonetheless praised by some for being reflective of the team's performance in the run-up to the Super Bowl.

In 2022, the sign was lit for the first time in 22 years. Using laser projections, rainbow colors were cast onto the sign to commemorate Pride Month. A few days later, digital projections were beamed onto the sign on the weekend of June 25 and 26 for 2022's BET Awards.

Guerilla 
The sign has been unofficially altered a number of times, often eliciting a great deal of attention. The modifications have included:

HOLLYWeeD – January 1976 and January 2017: The sign was first altered in 1976 following the passage of a state law decriminalizing cannabis. The sign was altered again early on New Year's Day in 2017, likely as an homage to a new California law legalizing recreational cannabis which passed during the 2016 election and which became effective on January 1.
 HOLYWOOD – April 1976 and September 1987: The 1976 alteration was for Easter sunrise service, viewable from the Hollywood Bowl. The 1987 alteration was for Pope John Paul II when he visited; the second L was covered.
 GO NAVY – December 1983: A group of Midshipmen, with permission, covered the sign for the Army-Navy football game's first and only West Coast appearance.
 RAFFEYSOD – in 1985, an obscure rock band from New Orleans named the Raffeys altered the sign in an act of unauthorized self-promotion.
 OLLYWOOD – In 1987 the first letter of the sign was obscured to protest the perceived hero worship of Oliver North during the Iran–Contra hearings.
 OIL WAR – In 1990 the sign was changed to protest the Gulf War.
 PEROTWOOD – Supporters of Ross Perot in the 1992 United States presidential election briefly changed the sign in October 1992.
 JOLLYGOOD – 1993, unknown
 CALTECH – 2003: Occurred on Hollywood's centennial (of its incorporation as a municipality), also one of Caltech's many senior pranks.
 SAVE THE PEAK – February 11, 2010, the original letters were covered with a series of large banners reading "SAVE THE PEAK", part of a campaign by The Trust for Public Land to protect the land around the Hollywood Sign from real estate development (see above). As the changeover progressed, variations such as "SALLYWOOD", "SOLLYWOOD", and "SAVETHEPOOD" sprung up.
 HOLLYBOOB – On February 1, 2021, the sign was altered by the YouTuber Joogsquad and Instagram influencer Julia Rose to challenge censorship on Instagram.
H🐮LLYWOOD – April 2, 2021: Los Angeles based band Junior Varsity put a cow face over the first "O" as a promotion for their single "Cold Blood".

Proposed 
Disney filed to put spots on the sign as a means of promoting its film 101 Dalmatians (1996); however, the request was later rescinded.

Mayor Eric Garcetti signed an executive directive for a program to light up the sign on his last day in office in 2022. Mayor Karen Bass rescinded the order 10 days later because "there were concerns about the legality of the order".

Depictions

Imitations
Multiple other places have imitated the sign in some way.
 System of a Down is an Armenian-American heavy metal band formed in Glendale, California, in 1994. On their album Toxicity, the Hollywood Sign is changed to "SYSTEM OF A DOWN", released on September 4, 2001.
 Mosgiel, a satellite suburb of the New Zealand city of Dunedin, erected an imitation of the Hollywood sign – reading MOSGIEL – in 1987.
 Since its opening in 1993, Mickey's Toontown at Disneyland has a faux hill with a sign that reads TOONTOWN and resembles the Hollywood sign.
 During the 2003 Scottish Parliament Election, the Scottish Conservative Party ran a billposter campaign depicting the Salisbury Crags of Holyrood Park with the message "FOLLYROOD" (in the style of the Hollywood Sign), with the uncompleted Scottish Parliament Building in the foreground.  The poster was intended as a jibe to the cost overruns and alleged overly elaborate design of the Parliament building, which the Conservatives opposed.
 The 2004 video game Grand Theft Auto: San Andreas partially takes place in the fictional city of Los Santos, based on Los Angeles; an imitation of the sign, which displays the name "Vinewood," is included as an in-game location that corresponds to its real-life counterpart.
 In May 2008, the Hollywood Chamber of Commerce licensed exclusive rights to Plymouth Rock Studios of Massachusetts to merge "Hollywood" with "East", creating Hollywood East, a new industry trademark that represents the growing film industry in New England. The studio plans to find a site in Plymouth, Massachusetts for the permanent installation of the sign.
 In 2009, a Hollinwood sign was erected by the side of the M60 motorway going through Hollinwood, Greater Manchester, to celebrate the City of Manchester's twinning with Los Angeles. The sign was erected during the night and then taken down by the Highways Agency, as it was considered a distraction to motorway drivers.
 In March 2010, authorities announced the Wellington Airport in New Zealand would erect a WELLYWOOD sign on the hillside of the Miramar Peninsula. This was to reflect the filmmaking community in Wellington, notably Weta Digital, which produced effects for Lord of the Rings, King Kong, and Avatar. However, the proposed sign's widespread unpopularity with local residents persuaded the airport staff to consider alternatives. On July 27, 2012, the city erected a sign that reads "Wellington" with the last letters blowing away to pay homage to Wellington's ever present wind.
 In November 2010, the Chilean municipality of Renca erected a sign high on Renca Hill that reads "Renca la lleva" ("Renca rocks", in Spanish).
 In 2010, in the hope of promoting new businesses in the town of Basildon in Essex, England, Basildon District Council erected the letters reading the name of the town alongside the A127 road at a cost of £90,000.
It became the world's largest free-standing sign of its kind.
 In 2011, a 20-foot tall replica was erected on the hillside of Monarch Hill Renewable Energy Park in Pompano Beach, Florida and used as a stand-in for the real sign during the filming of the film, Rock of Ages (2012).
 Entertainer Dolly Parton has many times cited the Hollywood Sign as the impetus behind her own Dollywood theme park, telling Spin Magazine in 1986, "When I first saw the Hollywood Sign, I thought, how wonderful would it be if I could change the 'H' to a 'D' for the day."
 The 2013 video game Grand Theft Auto V takes place in the fictional city of Los Santos, based on Los Angeles; an imitation of the sign, which displays the name "Vinewood," is included as an in-game location that corresponds to its real-life counterpart.
 In 2014, Druskininkai, Lithuania opened a sign to celebrate social media in the resort town Druskininkai, that was voted the most likeable by the followers of the "Likeable Lithuania campaign."
 There is an imitation of the sign at Hollywood, County Wicklow in Ireland.
 There is another imitation of the sign above the Harbor in Keelung, Taiwan along the Huzi Mountain trail.
 There is an imitation of the sign near Szastarka, Poland.
 There is an imitation of the sign on Mount Tâmpa in Brașov, Romania, mounted in 2004. Another one stands beside Râșnov Citadel.
 There is an imitation of the sign at the Mount Panorama Circuit in Bathurst in Australia. Unlike other imitations, it is not free-standing and the letters are a series of hillside letters forming the words "MOUNT PANORAMA".
 There is also an imitation of the sign in Marseille, France, in the north part of the city. It was erected in 2016 to promote the Netflix series Marseille.
 There is an imitation of the sign near Osage Beach the reads "Lake of the Ozarks" which welcomes visitors. It was installed in 2012 and the sign is visible on westbound US Route 54 after crossing a bridge over the Osage River.
 There is an imitation of the sign in Medora, North Dakota. It is behind the stage of the Burning Hills Amphitheatre.
 There is an imitation of the sign in Anguillara Sabazia, near Rome, Italy.
 An imitation sign was erected within the Gwydir Forest, North Wales, spelling ‘Llanrwst’ for the 2019 National Eisteddfod of Wales which was held in Llanrwst.
 There is an imitation of the sign in at Westview Park in Winnipeg, Manitoba. It is placed on a hill known locally as "Garbage Hill."
 There is an imitation of the sign in Dildo, Newfoundland and Labrador, that reads "DILDO", and was a gift from Jimmy Kimmel.
 There is an imitation sign outside of Craven, Saskatchewan. 
 There was an imitation of the sign near Palermo, Italy in 2001 as part of the Venice Biennal.
 There is an imitation of the sign in Taytay, Palawan in the Philippines.
 There is an imitation sign in Laeva, Estonia - a village on the main road between the two biggest cities Tallinn and Tartu.

In popular culture 
In films and television shows, the Hollywood Sign is often used as an establishing shot for Los Angeles and Hollywood. The sign is also shown getting damaged or destroyed from the events of a particular scene; period pieces may show just the "LAND" portion of the original sign being destroyed. It is an example of national landmarks being destroyed, a common feature seen in many disaster movies to increase the drama and tension. It is frequently a shorthand device to indicate the destruction of all of Los Angeles or the state of California. The sign has been depicted getting destroyed in the movies Earthquake (1974), Superman The Movie (1978), Independence Day (1996), The Day After Tomorrow (2004), 10.5 (2004), Terminator Salvation (2009), Sharknado (2013), San Andreas (2015), Despicable Me 3 (2017), and numerous other films.

See also 

 Hill figure
 Hillside letters
 Outpost sign

References

External links 

 

1923 establishments in California
Advertising structures
Billboards
Buildings and structures completed in 1923
Griffith Park
Hollywood Hills
Culture of Hollywood, Los Angeles
Individual signs in the United States
Landmarks in California
Los Angeles Historic-Cultural Monuments
Santa Monica Mountains
Symbols of California